The men's 5 miles race was held at the 1908 Summer Olympics in London.  It was discontinued after that in favour of the metric races of 5,000 metres and 10,000 metres. The competition was held on July 15, 1908, and July 18, 1908. 36 runners from 14 nations competed; seven from Great Britain, five from Sweden, four each from the United States, Canada and the Netherlands, two each from Denmark, France and Australasia, and one each from Hungary, South Africa, Greece, Germany, Bohemia and Italy. There were six preliminary heats, with the winner and the four runners-up with the best time advancing to the final. NOCs could enter up to 12 athletes.

Records

These are the standing world and Olympic records (in minutes) prior to the 1908 Summer Olympics. The  race was only held twice at the Olympic, 1906 and 1908.

Results

First round

All first round heats were held on July 15, 1908.

Heat 1

Ragueneau retired in the first quarter-mile. Coales dropped out after about four miles (6 km). Hefferon led for about half the race before Svanberg passed him.

Intermediate times: 1 mile 4:52.0, 2 miles 10:02.8, 3 miles 15:10.4, 4 miles 20:29.4

Heat 2

Voigt broke away from the pack at about four miles (6 km).

Intermediate times: 1 mile 5:06.2, 2 miles 10:40.0, 3 miles 16:06.0, 4 miles 21:16.0

Heat 3

Landqvist led the entire way, gradually pulling away from the rest of the runners.

Intermediate times: 1 mile 5:07.6, 2 miles 10:32.6, 3 miles 15:53.4, 4 miles 21:26.2

Heat 4

Intermediate times: 1 mile 4:49.6, 2 miles 9:59.8, 3 miles 15:12.4, 4 miles 20:31.4

Murphy was in the lead for the entirety of the race.

Heat 5

Fitzgerald, Robertson, and Stevenson were close together for the first mile, then Robertson broke away. This left Fitzgerald and Stevenson to fight over second place.

Intermediate times: 1 mile 4:52.8, 2 miles 10:02.6, 3 miles 15:18.4, 4 miles 20:37.4

Heat 6
Owen had the largest margin of victory in the preliminary heats, defeating Galbraith by a full lap of the track.

Intermediate times: 1 mile 4:46.8, 2 miles 9:56.0, 3 miles 15:19.2, 4 miles 20:51.0

Final

The final was held on July 18, 1908.

Fitzgerald, Murphy, Owen, Svanberg, Hefferon, and Voigt led at various times during the final. Owen led after one mile (1.6 km) reached in 4:46.2, with Hefferon leading at the two and three mile (5 km) marks, with times of 9:54.2 and 15:05.6. After four miles (6 km), Svanberg was in front, with a time of 20:19.2.  In the last two laps, Voigt sprinted to the lead which he kept until the end of the contest. He won the race setting a new Olympic record. As the competition has been discontinued, his Olympic record still stands.

References

Sources
 
 
 

Athletics at the 1908 Summer Olympics
10,000 metres at the Olympics